The logo of Wikipedia, a free online encyclopedia, is an unfinished globe constructed from jigsaw pieces—some pieces are missing at the top—each inscribed with a glyph from a different writing system. As displayed on the web pages of the English-language edition of the project, there is the wordmark "WIKIPEDIA" (stylized as WɪᴋɪᴘᴇᴅɪA) under the globe, and below that, the text "The Free Encyclopedia" in the free Linux Libertine font, which is open-source.

Design and history

Provisional logo 

Prior to development of the proper logo, Wikipedia used the flag of the United States, as the provisional logo for its website. It was added to the website by Jimmy Wales on 15 January 2001.

First logo (early 2001) 

Wikipedia's first true logo was an image that was originally submitted by Bjørn Smestad, under the username Bjornsm, for a Nupedia logo competition which took place in 2000. It was used as the logo for the website until the end of 2001.

The logo included a quote from the preface of the 1879 book Euclid and his Modern Rivals by Lewis Carroll. It utilized the fisheye effect, which made only part of the text readable. The used text was:

Second logo (late 2001) 

In November 2001, Wikipedia users began suggesting new logos for the website. A list of 24 leading candidates was chosen in the contest, which took place from November to December 2001. The winner was the last logo (#24), contributed by the user The Cunctator.

The logo included the quote, taken from Thomas Hobbes's 1651 book Leviathan, from chapter VI of part I, placed within the circle and distorted by the fisheye effect. Underneath it was written "Wikipedia" in the capital letters, with W and A being slightly taller than the other. Beneath that was placed the motto of Wikipedia: The Free Encyclopedia. The text used for the logo was:

As the logo utilized text in English language, its usage was not favored by other-language versions of Wikipedia. Some websites used similar designs with texts in their own languages. For example, Dutch Wikipedia used text from Multatuli's 1860 Max Havelaar classic book. Other websites used the logo with English text, painted in the colours of the national flags. Such design was used for example by Danish and Swedish versions, using the flags of Denmark and Sweden, respectively. The other option used by some versions of Wikipedia was to design their own distinct logos, for example the French Wikipedia, which used the golden (yellow) circle with a white dove on it, as its logo. Additionally, some websites used a logo with English text in it, with the motto "The Free Encyclopedia" translated to their languages. It was done, for example, by the German Wikipedia.

Third logo (2003)

Contest and improval 
In 2003, following a suggestion by Erik Möller, known under the username Eloquence, an international logo contest was conducted to find a new logo that was suitable for all language versions of Wikipedia. After a two-stage voting process, a design by Paul Stansifer, at the time known under username Paullusmagnus, won with considerable support. His project depicted an unfinished globe constructed of puzzle pieces, of multiple colors. It was covered by text with links in various languages and writing systems, to symbolize the continuous construction and development of the project. It was made in POV-Ray, using a puzzle image wrapped around a sphere.

A ratification vote was held soon after, to confirm community consensus. As a result, twelve direct adaptations of the design were created by members of the community. One of the propositions made by David Friedland, known under username Nohat, was chosen. Friedland removed the color and changed the overlaid text into one letter or symbol per puzzle piece. His design included various characters from various writing systems. The writing in the logo used Hoefler Text font. 

Before being officially released, the logo slightly lightened up and had replaced nearly obsolete kana wi (ヰ) from katakana script with modern kana wa (ワ) and small i (ィ). A smooth breathing mark before the Greek omega (Ω) was deleted and Russian Short I (Й) replaced by Russian I (И). It was adopted by the English Wikipedia on 26 September 2003.

Final version 
The logo included 16 characters from 16 different writing scripts, many of which—but not all, chosen to represent due to their similarity to letter W from English language, as in the name Wikipedia. The alphabets represented were as follows:

 

The logo included several mistakes. Due to a formatting error:
 letters va + i ( वि ) from Devanagari script, were wrongly rendered, being reversed in the process, showing as ( व​ि ).
 In the combined letters va + i ( ವಿ ) from Kannada script, the diacritic was attached to the wrong place. 
 In the case of the Japanese katakana, there was used a wrong kana: wa ( ワ ) was mistakenly used instead of kana u ( ウ ), forming wai ( ワィ ), instead of wi ( ウィ ), which is present in the Japanese name of the website, Wikipedia (ウィキペディア).

Redesign (2010) 

In late 2009, the Wikimedia Foundation undertook the efforts to fix the errors and generally update the puzzle globe logo. Among other concerns, the original logo did not scale well and some letters appeared distorted. For the new logo, the Wikimedia Foundation defined which characters appear on the "hidden" puzzle pieces, and had a three-dimensional computer model of the globe created to allow the generation of other views. A partial 3D globe was commissioned for the Wikimedia office.

The new design was published in May 2010. It features the new 3D rendering of the puzzle globe, as well as correct versions of previously wrong characters, including fixed versions of letters from Kannada and Devanagari, and usage of correct Japanese katakana characters. Additionally, several letters had been replaced by others. It included:
 ini (Ի) being replaced with vev (Վ), both originating from the Armenian alphabet;
 letter lo (ល) being replaced with combined letters vo and i (វិ), both originating from the Khmer script;
 combined letters wa and i (ཝི) from Tibetan script being replaced by short u (উ) letter from Bengali–Assamese script, while Tibetan character was moved elsewhere;
 letter Todo I (ᡅ) from Mongolian script being replaced by letter vini (ვ) from the Geogrian Mkhedruli script;
 radical 145+5 strokes (袓) from Simplified Chinese script being replaced by radical 120+8 strokes (維) from the Traditional Chinese script.
 letter resh (ר) being replaced by letter waw (ו), both originating from the Hebrew alphabet;
 r () from Klingon pIqaD script being replaced by letter wə (ው) from the Geʽez script;
 letter yodh (ي) being replaced by letter waw (و), both originating from the Arabic script;
 letter cho (ฉ) being replaced by combined letters wo waen and sara i (วิ), both originating from the Thai script.

The wordmark has been modified from the Hoefler Text font to the open-source Linux Libertine font, and the subtitle was no longer italicized. The "W" character, which was used in various other places in Wikipedia, such as the favicon, and was seen as an distinctive part of the Wikipedia brand, was stylized as crossed V's in the original logo, while the W in Linux Libertine was rendered with a single line. To provide the traditional appearance of the Wikipedia "W", a "crossed" W was added as an OpenType variant to the Linux Libertine font.

Glyphs in the Wikipedia logo redesign (2010) 
For the new logo had been designed the entire surface of its globe, including puzzle pieces hidden on the non visible parts of the logo. In total, there were designed 51 puzzle pieces, of which 18 were visible in the logo. There were 21 empty spaces left, for the missing puzzles.

The visible puzzle pieces are:
 in the leftmost column, from the top down: capital letter vev (Վ, transcription: v) from the Armenian alphabet, combined letters vo and i (វិ, transcription: vi) from the Khmer script, letter short u (উ, transcription: u) from the Bengali alphabet, combined letters va and i (वि, transcription: vi) from Devanagari script, letter vini (ვ, transcription: v) from Georgian mkhedruli scrip;]
 in the middle-left column, from the top down:  capital letter omega (Ω, transcription: o) from the Greek alphabet, the Radical 120 with 8 additional strokes]] (維) from the Traditional Chinese script, letter vi (ವಿ, transcription: vi) from the Kannada script, combined letters wa and i (ཝི, transcription: wi) from the Tibetan script.
in the middle-right column, from the top down: kanas u and small i (ウィ, romanization: wi) from the katakana script, capital letter W (W) from the Latin script, capital letter i (И, transcription: i) from the Cyrillic script, letter waw (ו, transcription: v) from the Hebrew alphabet, combined letters va and i (வி, transcription: vi) from the Tamil script;
 in the rightmost column, from the top down: letter wə (ው, transcription: wə) from the Geʽez script, isolated letter waw (و, transcription: w) from the Arabic alphabet, combined letters ieung, u and i (위, transcription: wi) from the Hangul script, combined letters wo waen and sara i (วิ, transcription: vi) from the Thai script.

The puzzle pieces from the not visible portion of the logo are:
 in the central left column, from the top down: capital letter V (V) from the Latin script, combined letters yodh and aleph (يا, transcription: yā) from the Arabic alphabet;
 in the first row to the left from the central left column, from the top down: capital letter wi (Ꮻ, transcription: wi) from the Cherokee syllabary, letter wa (ᥝ, transcripion: v) from the Tai Le script, capital letter pi (Π, transcription: p) from the Greek alphabet;
 in the second row to the left from the central left column, from the top down: combined letters va and i (వి, transcription: vi) from the Telugu script, capital letter E-acute (É) from the Latin script, combined letters v and i (ဝီ, transcription: vi) from the Mon–Burmese script, letter o (ᐅ, transcription: o) from the Canadian Aboriginal syllabics, combined letters wa and i (ᤘᤡ) from the Limbu script;
 in the third row to the left from the central left column, from the top down: letter uuinne (𐍅, transcription: w) from the Gothic alphabet, letter u (ଉ, transcription: u) from the Odia script, combined letters va and i (വി, transcription: vi) from the Malayalam script, letter wa (transcription: w) from the Mongolian script;
 in the fourth row to the left from the central left column, from the top down: combined letters va and i (વિ, transcription: vi) from the Gujarati script, combined letters wa and i (ᨓᨗ, transcrition: wi) from the Lontara script, letter vedi (Ⰲ, transcritpion: vi) from the Glagolitic script, capital letter U (U) from the Latin script;
 in the central right column, from the top down: capital letter de (Д, transcription: d) from the Cyrillic script, capital dotted I (İ) from the Latin script;
 in the first row to the right from the central right column: combined letters va and i (වි, transcription: vi) from the Sinhala script;
 in the second row to the right from the central right column, from the top down: combined letters vava and sihari (ਵਿ, transcription: vi) from the Gurmukhi script, combined letters vaavu and i (ވި, transcription: vi) from the Thaana script, capital letter H (H) from the Latin script, capital letter A-umlaut (Ä) from the Latin script;
 in the third row to the right from the central right column, from the top down: capital letter ya (Я, transcription: ya), combined letters w and i (ວິ, transcription: vi) from the Lao script, capital letter u (У, transcription: u) from the Cyrillic script, radical 12 with additional 6 strokes (典, pinyin: diǎn) from the Traditional Chinese script;
 in the fourth row to the right from the central right column, from the top down: combined letters wa and i (ꦮꦶ, transcription: wi) from the Javanese script, isolated letter waw (ܘ, transcription: w) from the Syriac alphabet, capital letter ve (В, transcription: v) from the Cyrillic script, letter wi (ᜏᜒ, transcription: wi) from the Baybayin script.

Anniversary logos

10th anniversary logo 
  
On 15 January 2011, a special logo replaced the standard globe on the English Wikipedia in order to mark the tenth anniversary of Wikipedia's founding. The logo depicts a single black jigsaw piece, representing the addition of another piece to the puzzle. On it is written "10 years".

20th anniversary logos 

On 14 January 2021, a 4-sectioned logo was used instead of the puzzle globe on the English Wikipedia, in order to mark the 20th anniversary of Wikipedia. The 4 sections, depict, in clockwise order, starting from the top-left:
 yellow background, a woman reading a book with the "W" on it, signifying Wikipedia;
 blue background, a computer showing a blue screen with a "W" on it, signifying Wikipedia;
 red background, a phone showing a blue screen with a "W" on it, signifying Wikipedia;
 green background, the normal Wikipedia globe, in blue, but with most letters aside from the "W" being replaced with various other objects and symbols.

On 22 January 2021, the previous anniversary logo was replaced with a less striking version, consisting of the normative Wikipedia globe above the text "20 years of Wikipedia – Over One Billion Edits" to commemorate the concurrent milestone of reaching one billion recorded edits to the English Wikipedia.

Physical recreations 

In 2009, the Wikimedia Foundation had put a 3D printed signage depicting a life-size half of the Wikipedia globe, in its headquarters in San Francisco, California, United States. It was a made by Because We Can build and design firm based in Oakland, California.

On 22 October 2014, in the town of Słubice, Poland, was unveiled the Wikipedia Monument, a statue by sculptor Mihran Hakobyan honoring Wikipedia contributors. The monument depicts four nude figures holding aloft a globe based on the Wikipedia logo, reaching over  up, made out of the fiber and resin. It is the world's first monument to the online encyclopedia.

On 29 September 2017, the sculpture of the logo of Wikipedia was submerged to the bottom of Lake Sevan in Armenia, to form an artificial reef. It was done thanks to the joint efforts of the Wikimedia Armenia community and ArmDiving divers' club. The 2 metre-wide and 2 metre-high sculpture (the largest depiction of Wikipedia logo in the world) was made in Armenia for the annual meeting of the Central and Eastern Europe Wikimedia affiliates, Wikimedia CEE Meeting that the country hosted in August 2016 in Dilijan.

Trademark

The 2010 logo is registered with the Madrid system under registration numbers 1221024, 1221826, and 1238122.

In the United States, the 2003 and 2010 logos are registered trademarks under registration numbers 3594356 and 4710546, respectively.

The 2003 and 2010 logos are registered as a Community Trade Mark of the European Union by the Wikimedia Foundation. The 2003 logo bears a filing date of 31 January 2008 and a registration date of 20 January 2009. The 2010 logo bears a filing date of 28 March 2014 and a registration date of 22 August 2014.

On 1 January 2021, the 2003 and 2010 logos were granted UK trademark numbers as a result of Brexit.

On 24 October 2014, the Wikimedia Foundation released the logo, along with all other logos belonging to the Foundation, under the Creative Commons Attribution-ShareAlike 3.0 license.

Gallery of logos

Historical logos

Special logos

Anniversaries

Milestone commemorations

Events

Holidays

References

External links
 Wikimedia Blog: Wikipedia in 3D – 3D version of the Wikipedia logo unveiled; description of the new puzzle globe logo
 Wikimedia Blog: A new look for Wikipedia
 

logo
logo
Wikipedia
Symbols introduced in 2001
Symbols introduced in 2003
Symbols introduced in 2010